Diploglottis pedleyi is a shrub or small tree, found in tropical Queensland. Usually seen as an understorey plant in well developed rainforest, growing from one to six metres tall. The type specimen is from The Boulders near Babinda in the wet tropics.

References

External links

Flora of Queensland
Sapindales of Australia
Taxa named by Sally T. Reynolds
pedleyi